Avrodh: The Siege Within is an Indian Hindi-language military drama streaming television series which premiered on SonyLIV on 31 July 2020. The series, directed by Raj Acharya and produced by Applause Entertainment, Irada Entertainment and Mehra Entertainment, is a retelling of the 2016 Uri attack and the following surgical strikes. It is based on a chapter from the book India’s Most Fearless by Shiv Aroor and Rahul Singh. A standalone sequel, titled Avrodh: The Siege Within 2, was released in June 2022.

About 
Avrodh is based on the chapter "We Don’t Really Know Fear" from Shiv Aroor and Rahul Singh's India's Most Fearless. The first seven episodes of the nine-part series delve into the planning of the strike, while the last two cover the strike itself. Each episode has an effective runtime of 23 to 25 minutes. While the planning continues at the highest levels of government in New Delhi, the mission is kept secret from even the senior most ministers. The story covers the death of a militant leader, Bilawal Wani, and the aftermath, the functioning of militant and terrorist groups in Jammu and Kashmir, Pakistan's involvement in cross border attacks, international pressure, and even the domestic bureaucratic angle and how journalists fit into the picture. The weapons that were part of the cross border strikes is seen, including M4A1s, Galils and TAR-21s.

Promotion 
Promotion of the web-series was done though a trailer showcasing battle scenes and important decisions being taken in the halls of power at Raisina Hill. Extensive digital promotion took place, including a virtual press conference and social media promotion. Along with promotion on The Kapil Sharma Show.

Cast 
 Amit Sadh as Major Videep Singh, team leader (Para SF)
 Vikram Gokhale as Prime Minister, based on Narendra Modi
 Neeraj Kabi as NSA Shailesh Malviya, based on Ajit Doval
 Darshan Kumaar as Major Raunaq Gautam (Bihar Regiment)
 Ananth Narayan Mahadevan as Satish Mahadevan
 Madhurima Tuli as Journalist Namrata Joshi
 Nikhil Sangha as Pankaj Kumar, Namrata's boss
 Shehzad Shaikh as Sarthak Srivastav, Namrata's boyfriend
 Anil George as Abu Hafeez, mastermind of the Uri attack
 Umar Sharif as Wahab
 Pavail Gulati as Major Rishabh Sood (Dogra Regiment)
 Adarsh Balakrishna as Racy
 Arif Zakaria as Ali Raza Khan 
 Mir Sarwar as Fakhruddin Rasheed
 Mohommed Ali Shah as Captain Irrfan Khan
 Bikramjeet Kanwarpal as Colonel Ajay Saxena (Para SF) 
 Mohit Chauhan as Colonel B.K. Rastogi (Dogra Regiment)
Vineet Singh as Captain A.P. Mahesh Jagtap 
Iqbal Singh Singha as DGMO Lt.General Singha, based on Ranbir Singh 
Deepak Kriplani as Navy Chief Chawla 
Namit as Air Chief Marshal Deo 
Shiladitya Banerjee as Lt.General Anil Dua 
 Meghana Kaushik as Niharika
 Praveena Deshpande as Sunita Bharadwaj
 Adil Pala as Adil (Terrorist 1)
 Moin Imtiaz Ganai as Moin (Terrorist 2)
 Sawar Raja as Sawar (Terrorist 3)
 Mark Bennigton as Bob Terry
 Prahan Rao as Captain Chirag Malhotra
 Saurabh Dubey as Rajesh Chauhan
Sonel Singh as Doctor Gayatri
Syed Fahad Andrabi as Shoaib
 Vivek Sangotra as Momin
 Sandeep Verma as Sartaj

Season 2 
Sanjay Suri 
Abir Chatterjee
Mohan Agashe
Ananth Mahadevan
Aahana S Kumra
Rajesh Khattar
Karan Thakur(Actor)
Arif Zakaria
Adil Pala
Umar Nasir

Reception

Critical reception 
Deepa Alexander of The Hindu gave Avrodh a positive review, saying that there are ample reasons to watch the web-series. Arushi Jain, writing for the Indian Express, described it as "a retelling, sans any jingoistic and provocative dialogues or scenes", of how the Uri attack was avenged, which makes it "an interesting watch" unspoiled by patriotic excesses. India Today review calls Avrodh "a well-rounded series", with both the "guns and the glory" as well as the "facts". Without being "hyper-nationalistic", Avrodh manages to showcase the complexities that went into the planning of the strike, including how terrorist groups function, the backing from ISI, international pressure and a plethora of other aspects. Sreeparna Sengupta wrote in her Times of India review that "the planning, execution and training for the mission are shown with meticulous detailing". Sengupta also wrote that the cast pulls of a strong performance and while the narrative is predictable, "there are enough twists and turns in Avrodh that make it a gripping watch". Shreya Paul in the Firstpost wrote that Avrodh is a retelling of India's retaliation to the Uri attack, without "unnecessary excesses". Nandini Ramnath wrote in Scroll.in that "the script is straight out of a government dossier". AdGully wrote that Avrodh "is this story behind how India shrugged off its indecisiveness". Film Companion wrote that life in Kashmir is depicted well, however the show "feels like propaganda", "confuses love for India with indifference for human life" and questioned what the show would mean for Kashmiris without 4G internet. Koimoi felt that more could have been done with Avrodh, and as far as it being propaganda or not, "decide for yourself". Thandora Times said the series is a must watch, whereas a Mashable review called Avrodh a "piece of crap" and an "abysmally bad piece of propaganda".

References

Further reading 
 Giridhar Jha (1 August 2020) Not Only Ajit Doval, My Character In Avrodh Based On All NSAs: Paatal Lok Actor Neeraj Kabi. Outlook India

External links 
 Avrodh: The Siege Within  on Sony Liv
 

2020s Indian television miniseries
Hindi-language web series
Indian drama web series
2020 Indian television series debuts
2020 Indian television series endings
Indian television series
Indian action television series
Indian crime drama television series
Indian historical television series
Indian military television series
Indian period television series
Indian political television series
Indian thriller television series
Television series based on actual events
Cultural depictions of Narendra Modi
Cultural depictions of Indian men
Indian Armed Forces in fiction
Cultural depictions of prime ministers of India
Television shows set in Jammu and Kashmir
Television shows set in Pakistan
Television shows set in Delhi
Kashmir conflict in fiction
SonyLIV original films